Lycée Martin Luther King is a senior high school/sixth-form college in Bussy-Saint-Georges, Seine-et-Marne, France, in the Paris metropolitan area.

It is one of at least three schools in France named for slain U.S. civil rights leader Martin Luther King Jr.

References

External links
 Lycée Martin Luther King 

Lycées in Seine-et-Marne
Lycées in Marne-la-Vallée